McDonald Township is an inactive township in Jasper County, in the U.S. state of Missouri.

McDonald Township has the name of the local McDonald family.

References

Townships in Missouri
Townships in Jasper County, Missouri